Alexus is a given name and a surname. Notable people with this name include the following:

Given name
Alexus Laird (born 1993), Seychellois swimmer

Surname
Ajiona Alexus (born 1996), American actress

See also

Alexis (disambiguation)
Alexius